The Bandit of Tropico is a 1912 American silent short adventure film starring Harry von Meter as "The Bandit" and Vivian Rich his daughter.

External links

1912 films
1912 adventure films
American adventure films
American silent short films
1912 short films
American black-and-white films
Universal Pictures short films
1910s American films
Silent adventure films